The 2000 Toronto Blue Jays season was the franchise's 24th season of Major League Baseball. It resulted in the Blue Jays finishing third in the American League East with a record of 83 wins and 79 losses. It was the team's first season with new mascots Ace and Diamond.

Offseason
November 8, 1999: Raúl Mondesí was traded by the Los Angeles Dodgers with Pedro Borbón to the Toronto Blue Jays for Shawn Green and Jorge Nunez (minors).
November 11, 1999: Paul Spoljaric was traded by the Toronto Blue Jays with Pat Hentgen to the St. Louis Cardinals for Alberto Castillo, Matt DeWitt, and Lance Painter.
December 13, 1999: DeWayne Wise was drafted by the Toronto Blue Jays from the Cincinnati Reds in the 1999 rule 5 draft.

Regular season

Season standings

Record vs. opponents

Notable transactions
July 19, 2000: Esteban Loaiza was traded by the Texas Rangers to the Toronto Blue Jays for Darwin Cubillán and Michael Young.
July 26, 2000: Rob Ducey was traded by the Philadelphia Phillies to the Toronto Blue Jays for a player to be named later.

2000 Draft picks
Source 

The 2002 MLB draft was held in June 2001.

Roster

Game log

|- align="center" bgcolor="bbffbb"
| 1 || April 3 || Royals || 5 – 4 || Koch (1-0) || Spradlin (0-1) || || 40,898 || 1-0
|- align="center" bgcolor="bbffbb"
| 2 || April 4 || Royals || 6 – 3 || Halladay (1-0) || Witasick (0-1) || Koch (1) || 13,514 || 2-0
|- align="center" bgcolor="ffbbbb"
| 3 || April 5 || Royals || 4 – 3 || Rosado (1-0) || Carpenter (0-1) || Bottalico (1) || 14,957 || 2-1
|- align="center" bgcolor="ffbbbb"
| 4 || April 6 || Royals || 9 – 3 || Durbin (1-0) || Escobar (0-1) || Rigby (1) || 14,336 || 2-2
|- align="center" bgcolor="ffbbbb"
| 5 || April 7 || @ Rangers || 11 – 5 || Clark (1-0) || Castillo (0-1) || || 31,619 || 2-3
|- align="center" bgcolor="bbffbb"
| 6 || April 8 || @ Rangers || 4 – 0 || Wells (1-0) || Rogers (1-1) || || 37,128 || 3-3
|- align="center" bgcolor="ffbbbb"
| 7 || April 9 || @ Rangers || 7 – 5 || Helling (1-0) || Halladay (1-1) || || 40,186 || 3-4
|- align="center" bgcolor="ffbbbb"
| 8 || April 10 || @ Angels || 6 – 0 || Schoeneweis (2-0) || Carpenter (0-2) || || 14,338 || 3-5
|- align="center" bgcolor="ffbbbb"
| 9 || April 11 || @ Angels || 5 – 4 || Ortiz (1-0) || Escobar (0-2) || Percival (2) || 15,229 || 3-6
|- align="center" bgcolor="bbffbb"
| 10 || April 12 || @ Angels || 6 – 2 || Borbón (1-0) || Petkovsek (0-1) || || 16,494 || 4-6
|- align="center" bgcolor="ffbbbb"
| 11 || April 14 || Mariners || 11 – 9 || Moyer (2-1) || Wells (1-1) || || 17,306 || 4-7
|- align="center" bgcolor="ffbbbb"
| 12 || April 15 || Mariners || 17 – 6 || Rodriguez (1-0) || Halladay (1-2) || Paniagua (1) || 21,754 || 4-8
|- align="center" bgcolor="ffbbbb"
| 13 || April 16 || Mariners || 19 – 7 || García (2-1) || Carpenter (0-3) || || 15,325 || 4-9
|- align="center" bgcolor="bbffbb"
| 14 || April 17 || Angels || 7 – 1 || Escobar (1-2) || Ortiz (1-1) || || 13,622 || 5-9
|- align="center" bgcolor="ffbbbb"
| 15 || April 18 || Angels || 16 – 10 || Dickson (2-0) || Castillo (0-2) || || 13,825 || 5-10
|- align="center" bgcolor="bbffbb"
| 16 || April 19 || Angels || 12 – 4 || Wells (2-1) || Hill (1-3) || || 13,572 || 6-10
|- align="center" bgcolor="bbffbb"
| 17 || April 20 || Angels || 12 – 11 || Halladay (2-2) || Bottenfield (1-2) || Koch (2) || 13,985 || 7-10
|- align="center" bgcolor="bbffbb"
| 18 || April 21 || Yankees || 8 – 3 || Carpenter (1-3) || Mendoza (2-1) || || 25,921 || 8-10
|- align="center" bgcolor="bbffbb"
| 19 || April 22 || Yankees || 8 – 2 || Escobar (2-2) || Cone (0-2) || || 30,167 || 9-10
|- align="center" bgcolor="ffbbbb"
| 20 || April 23 || Yankees || 10 – 7 || Hernández (4-0) || Andrews (0-1) || Rivera (6) || 20,485 || 9-11
|- align="center" bgcolor="bbffbb"
| 21 || April 24 || @ Athletics || 3 – 2 || Wells (3-1) || Appier (3-2) || Koch (3) || 8,363 || 10-11
|- align="center" bgcolor="ffbbbb"
| 22 || April 25 || @ Athletics || 11 – 2 || Hudson (2-2) || Halladay (2-3) || || 8,266 || 10-12
|- align="center" bgcolor="bbffbb"
| 23 || April 26 || @ Athletics || 4 – 2 || Carpenter (2-3) || Olivares (1-3) || Koch (4) || 14,477 || 11-12
|- align="center" bgcolor="ffbbbb"
| 24 || April 28 || @ Yankees || 6 – 0 || Cone (1-2) || Escobar (2-3) || || 35,987 || 11-13
|- align="center" bgcolor="bbffbb"
| 25 || April 29 || @ Yankees || 6 – 2 || Wells (4-1) || Hernández (4-1) || Koch (5) || 38,783 || 12-13
|- align="center" bgcolor="ffbbbb"
| 26 || April 30 || @ Yankees || 7 – 1 || Clemens (2-2) || Halladay (2-4) || || 43,721 || 12-14
|-

|- align="center" bgcolor="bbffbb"
| 27 || May 1 || @ White Sox || 5 – 3 || Carpenter (3-3) || Wells (2-3) || Koch (6) || 14,448 || 13-14
|- align="center" bgcolor="bbffbb"
| 28 || May 2 || @ White Sox || 4 – 1 || Castillo (1-2) || Wunsch (0-1) || Koch (7) || 10,397 || 14-14
|- align="center" bgcolor="ffbbbb"
| 29 || May 3 || @ White Sox || 7 – 3 || Baldwin (5-0) || Escobar (2-4) || Foulke (4) || 12,026 || 14-15
|- align="center" bgcolor="bbffbb"
| 30 || May 4 || Indians || 8 – 1 || Wells (5-1) || Finley (3-1) || || 16,637 || 15-15
|- align="center" bgcolor="bbffbb"
| 31 || May 5 || Indians || 11 – 10 || Koch (2-0) || Shuey (1-1) || || 19,191 || 16-15
|- align="center" bgcolor="ffbbbb"
| 32 || May 6 || Indians || 8 – 6 || Rincón (1-0) || Quantrill (0-1) || Karsay (5) || 23,730 || 16-16
|- align="center" bgcolor="ffbbbb"
| 33 || May 7 || Indians || 10 – 8 (12)|| Shuey (2-1) || Gunderson (0-1) || Karsay (6) || 19,161 || 16-17
|- align="center" bgcolor="bbffbb"
| 34 || May 8 || Orioles || 6 – 5 || Escobar (3-4) || Johnson (0-2) || Koch (8) || 15,103 || 17-17
|- align="center" bgcolor="bbffbb"
| 35 || May 9 || Orioles || 6 – 4 || Wells (6-1) || Mussina (1-4) || Koch (9) || 15,177 || 18-17
|- align="center" bgcolor="bbffbb"
| 36 || May 10 || Orioles || 7 – 2 || Painter (1-0) || Erickson (0-1) || Quantrill (1) || 15,598 || 19-17
|- align="center" bgcolor="ffbbbb"
| 37 || May 12 || @ Devil Rays || 4 – 3 || White (1-2) || Carpenter (3-4) || Lopez (2) || 17,532 || 19-18
|- align="center" bgcolor="bbffbb"
| 38 || May 13 || @ Devil Rays || 8 – 4 || Escobar (4-4) || Lidle (0-1) || || 20,054 || 20-18
|- align="center" bgcolor="bbffbb"
| 39 || May 14 || @ Devil Rays || 3 – 2 || Wells (7-1) || Lopez (2-3) || || 15,788 || 21-18
|- align="center" bgcolor="ffbbbb"
| 40 || May 15 || Red Sox || 8 – 1 || Schourek (2-3) || Castillo (1-3) || || 16,124 || 21-19
|- align="center" bgcolor="bbffbb"
| 41 || May 16 || Red Sox || 7 – 6 || Munro (1-0) || Lowe (2-1) || || 17,663 || 22-19
|- align="center" bgcolor="ffbbbb"
| 42 || May 17 || Red Sox || 8 – 0 || Martínez (7-1) || Carpenter (3-5) || || 20,078 || 22-20
|- align="center" bgcolor="ffbbbb"
| 43 || May 19 || White Sox || 5 – 3 || Sirotka (3-3) || Escobar (4-5) || Foulke (6) || 18,268 || 22-21
|- align="center" bgcolor="ffbbbb"
| 44 || May 20 || White Sox || 6 – 2 || Baldwin (7-0) || Wells (7-2) || || 20,091 || 22-22
|- align="center" bgcolor="ffbbbb"
| 45 || May 21 || White Sox || 2 – 1 || Eldred (4-2) || Castillo (1-4) || Foulke (7) || 18,264 || 22-23
|- align="center" bgcolor="bbffbb"
| 46 || May 22 || White Sox || 4 – 3 || Koch (3-0) || Howry (0-1) || || 19,167 || 23-23
|- align="center" bgcolor="bbffbb"
| 47 || May 23 || @ Red Sox || 3 – 2 || Carpenter (4-5) || Martínez (7-2) || Koch (10) || 33,402 || 24-23
|- align="center" bgcolor="ffbbbb"
| 48 || May 24 || @ Red Sox || 6 – 3 (11)|| Cormier (2-0) || Frascatore (0-1) || || 31,250 || 24-24
|- align="center" bgcolor="bbffbb"
| 49 || May 25 || @ Red Sox || 11 – 6 || Wells (8-2) || Schourek (2-4) || || 32,716 || 25-24
|- align="center" bgcolor="bbffbb"
| 50 || May 26 || @ Tigers || 8 – 2 || Frascatore (1-1) || Brocail (1-3) || || 33,068 || 26-24
|- align="center" bgcolor="ffbbbb"
| 51 || May 27 || @ Tigers || 4 – 3 || Brocail (2-3) || Quantrill (0-2) || || 29,584 || 26-25
|- align="center" bgcolor="bbffbb"
| 52 || May 28 || @ Tigers || 12 – 7 || Andrews (1-1) || Blair (2-1) || || 29,105 || 27-25
|- align="center" bgcolor="ffbbbb"
| 53 || May 30 || Twins || 4 – 1 || Redman (4-0) || Escobar (4-6) || Hawkins (2) || 16,371 || 27-26
|- align="center" bgcolor="bbffbb"
| 54 || May 31 || Twins || 4 – 2 || Wells (9-2) || Radke (3-6) || Koch (11) || 17,305 || 28-26
|-

|- align="center" bgcolor="ffbbbb"
| 55 || June 1 || Twins || 5 – 1 || Milton (5-1) || Castillo (1-5) || || 30,444 || 28-27
|- align="center" bgcolor="ffbbbb"
| 56 || June 2 || @ Marlins || 11 – 10 || Bones (1-0) || Munro (1-1) || Alfonseca (16) || 12,209 || 28-28
|- align="center" bgcolor="ffbbbb"
| 57 || June 3 || @ Marlins || 2 – 1 || Looper (1-1) || Koch (3-1) || Alfonseca (17) || 17,546 || 28-29
|- align="center" bgcolor="bbffbb"
| 58 || June 4 || @ Marlins || 7 – 2 || Escobar (5-6) || Núñez (0-6) || || 11,007 || 29-29
|- align="center" bgcolor="bbffbb"
| 59 || June 5 || @ Braves || 9 – 3 || Wells (10-2) || Burkett (4-3) || || 33,641 || 30-29
|- align="center" bgcolor="ffbbbb"
| 60 || June 6 || @ Braves || 7 – 6 || Remlinger (2-1) || Frascatore (1-2) || || 39,454 || 30-30
|- align="center" bgcolor="bbffbb"
| 61 || June 7 || @ Braves || 12 – 8 || Cubillán (1-0) || Millwood (4-5) || Koch (12) || 33,240 || 31-30
|- align="center" bgcolor="bbffbb"
| 62 || June 9 || Expos || 13 – 3 || Carpenter (5-5) || Tucker (0-1) || || 26,122 || 32-30
|- align="center" bgcolor="ffbbbb"
| 63 || June 10 || Expos || 11 – 2 || Armas (2-3) || Escobar (5-7) || || 30,239 || 32-31
|- align="center" bgcolor="bbffbb"
| 64 || June 11 || Expos || 8 – 3 || Koch (4-1) || Mota (0-1) || || 25,838 || 33-31
|- align="center" bgcolor="bbffbb"
| 65 || June 12 || @ Tigers || 4 – 2 || Castillo (2-5) || Nomo (2-6) || Koch (13) || 21,779 || 34-31
|- align="center" bgcolor="ffbbbb"
| 66 || June 13 || @ Tigers || 16 – 3 || Blair (3-1) || Andrews (1-2) || || 23,314 || 34-32
|- align="center" bgcolor="bbffbb"
| 67 || June 14 || @ Tigers || 8 – 1 || Carpenter (6-5) || Weaver (3-6) || || 27,479 || 35-32
|- align="center" bgcolor="ffbbbb"
| 68 || June 16 || @ Red Sox || 7 – 4 || Pichardo (2-0) || Escobar (5-8) || Lowe (16) || 33,638 || 35-33
|- align="center" bgcolor="bbffbb"
| 69 || June 17 || @ Red Sox || 11 – 10 || Wells (11-2) || Martínez (5-4) || Koch (14) || 32,951 || 36-33
|- align="center" bgcolor="bbffbb"
| 70 || June 18 || @ Red Sox || 5 – 1 || Castillo (3-5) || Fassero (6-3) || Koch (15) || 32,925 || 37-33
|- align="center" bgcolor="ffbbbb"
| 71 || June 20 || Tigers || 18 – 6 || Weaver (4-6) || Carpenter (6-6) || || 18,850 || 37-34
|- align="center" bgcolor="bbffbb"
| 72 || June 21 || Tigers || 6 – 0 || Escobar (6-8) || Moehler (4-4) || || 18,125 || 38-34
|- align="center" bgcolor="bbffbb"
| 73 || June 22 || Tigers || 7 – 4 || Wells (12-2) || Nomo (2-7) || || 20,259 || 39-34
|- align="center" bgcolor="bbffbb"
| 74 || June 23 || Red Sox || 5 – 4 || Castillo (4-5) || Wasdin (0-3) || Koch (16) || 28,198 || 40-34
|- align="center" bgcolor="bbffbb"
| 75 || June 24 || Red Sox || 6 – 4 || Halladay (3-4) || Rose (3-5) || Koch (17) || 30,130 || 41-34
|- align="center" bgcolor="bbffbb"
| 76 || June 25 || Red Sox || 6 – 5 (13)|| DeWitt (1-0) || Florie (0-2) || || 31,022 || 42-34
|- align="center" bgcolor="ffbbbb"
| 77 || June 27 || @ Devil Rays || 11 – 1 || Trachsel (6-7) || Escobar (6-9) || || 14,657 || 42-35
|- align="center" bgcolor="bbffbb"
| 78 || June 28 || @ Devil Rays || 5 – 2 || Wells (13-2) || Yan (4-6) || || 15,308 || 43-35
|- align="center" bgcolor="bbffbb"
| 79 || June 29 || @ Devil Rays || 12 – 3 || Castillo (5-5) || Lidle (1-3) || || 21,666 || 44-35
|- align="center" bgcolor="ffbbbb"
| 80 || June 30 || @ Orioles || 8 – 3 || Rapp (5-5) || Halladay (3-5) || || 40,412 || 44-36
|-

|- align="center" bgcolor="ffbbbb"
| 81 || July 1 || @ Orioles || 12 – 5 || Ponson (5-4) || Carpenter (6-7) || || 40,876 || 44-37
|- align="center" bgcolor="ffbbbb"
| 82 || July 2 || @ Orioles || 3 – 2 || Trombley (4-2) || Quantrill (0-3) || Mills (1) || 41,267 || 44-38
|- align="center" bgcolor="bbffbb"
| 83 || July 3 || @ Orioles || 6 – 4 || Wells (14-2) || Johnson (0-7) || Koch (18) || 39,617 || 45-38
|- align="center" bgcolor="ffbbbb"
| 84 || July 4 || @ Indians || 9 – 4 || Colón (8-5) || Frascatore (1-3) || || 43,222 || 45-39
|- align="center" bgcolor="ffbbbb"
| 85 || July 5 || @ Indians || 15 – 7 || Brewington (2-0) || Quantrill (0-4) || || 43,141 || 45-40
|- align="center" bgcolor="bbffbb"
| 86 || July 6 || @ Indians || 9 – 6 || Carpenter (7-7) || Burba (8-4) || Koch (19) || 43,237 || 46-40
|- align="center" bgcolor="ffbbbb"
| 87 || July 7 || @ Expos || 10 – 5 || Lira (2-0) || Quantrill (0-5) || || 13,317 || 46-41
|- align="center" bgcolor="bbffbb"
| 88 || July 8 || @ Expos || 6 – 3 || Wells (15-2) || Armas (4-6) || Koch (20) || 17,420 || 47-41
|- align="center" bgcolor="bbffbb"
| 89 || July 9 || @ Expos || 13 – 3 || Castillo (6-5) || Hermanson (6-7) || || 22,489 || 48-41
|- align="center" bgcolor="ffbbbb"
| 90 || July 13 || Phillies || 8 – 5 || Schilling (5-5) || Carpenter (7-8) || Brantley (14) || 22,163 || 48-42
|- align="center" bgcolor="bbffbb"
| 91 || July 14 || Phillies || 3 – 2 || Koch (5-1) || Brantley (1-3) || || 21,385 || 49-42
|- align="center" bgcolor="ffbbbb"
| 92 || July 15 || Phillies || 7 – 3 || Chen (5-0) || Wells (15-3) || || 24,828 || 49-43
|- align="center" bgcolor="bbffbb"
| 93 || July 16 || Mets || 7 – 3 || Halladay (4-5) || Leiter (10-3) || Koch (21) || 30,139 || 50-43
|- align="center" bgcolor="ffbbbb"
| 94 || July 17 || Mets || 7 – 5 (11)|| Franco (4-3) || Borbón (1-1) || Benítez (21) || 23,129 || 50-44
|- align="center" bgcolor="ffbbbb"
| 95 || July 18 || Mets || 11 – 7 || Jones (4-4) || Carpenter (7-9) || || 24,633 || 50-45
|- align="center" bgcolor="bbffbb"
| 96 || July 19 || Devil Rays || 5 – 2 || Escobar (7-9) || Lopez (6-7) || Koch (22) || 18,751 || 51-45
|- align="center" bgcolor="bbffbb"
| 97 || July 20 || Devil Rays || 6 – 5 || Quantrill (1-5) || White (3-6) || Koch (23) || 18,915 || 52-45
|- align="center" bgcolor="ffbbbb"
| 98 || July 21 || Orioles || 9 – 5 || Rapp (6-6) || Halladay (4-6) || || 23,470 || 52-46
|- align="center" bgcolor="ffbbbb"
| 99 || July 22 || Orioles || 8 – 2 || Mercedes (5-4) || Loaiza (5-7) || || 27,585 || 52-47
|- align="center" bgcolor="bbffbb"
| 100 || July 23 || Orioles || 4 – 1 || Castillo (7-5) || Mussina (6-10) || Koch (24) || 26,276 || 53-47
|- align="center" bgcolor="ffbbbb"
| 101 || July 25 || Indians || 10 – 3 || Finley (9-7) || Escobar (7-10) || || 28,672 || 53-48
|- align="center" bgcolor="bbffbb"
| 102 || July 26 || Indians || 8 – 1 || Wells (16-3) || Colón (9-8) || || 31,183 || 54-48
|- align="center" bgcolor="bbffbb"
| 103 || July 27 || @ Mariners || 7 – 2 || Loaiza (6-7) || Rhodes (3-5) || || 40,398 || 55-48
|- align="center" bgcolor="ffbbbb"
| 104 || July 28 || @ Mariners || 7 – 4 || García (3-1) || Carpenter (7-10) || Sasaki (25) || 37,126 || 55-49
|- align="center" bgcolor="ffbbbb"
| 105 || July 29 || @ Mariners || 6 – 5 (13)|| Tomko (5-3) || Halladay (4-7) || || 45,264 || 55-50
|- align="center" bgcolor="ffbbbb"
| 106 || July 30 || @ Mariners || 10 – 6 || Sele (12-6) || Escobar (7-11) || Paniagua (2) || 43,648 || 55-51
|- align="center" bgcolor="ffbbbb"
| 107 || July 31 || @ Athletics || 6 – 1 || Hudson (12-3) || Wells (16-4) || || 13,608 || 55-52
|-

|- align="center" bgcolor="ffbbbb"
| 108 || August 1 || @ Athletics || 3 – 1 (10)|| Isringhausen (5-3) || Koch (5-2) || || 17,469 || 55-53
|- align="center" bgcolor="ffbbbb"
| 109 || August 2 || @ Athletics || 5 – 4 || Mecir (8-2) || Guthrie (1-2) || Isringhausen (24) || 26,473 || 55-54
|- align="center" bgcolor="bbffbb"
| 110 || August 3 || Rangers || 3 – 1 || Castillo (8-5) || Rogers (10-9) || Koch (25) || 24,825 || 56-54
|- align="center" bgcolor="bbffbb"
| 111 || August 4 || Rangers || 10 – 8 || Quantrill (2-5) || Venafro (1-1) || Koch (26) || 23,518 || 57-54
|- align="center" bgcolor="bbffbb"
| 112 || August 5 || Rangers || 8 – 5 || Wells (17-4) || Davis (4-3) || Koch (27) || 26,143 || 58-54
|- align="center" bgcolor="ffbbbb"
| 113 || August 6 || Rangers || 11 – 6 || Glynn (3-1) || Escobar (7-12) || || 28,780 || 58-55
|- align="center" bgcolor="ffbbbb"
| 114 || August 7 || @ Royals || 8 – 7 || Stein (3-3) || Loaiza (6-8) || Bottalico (12) || 17,533 || 58-56
|- align="center" bgcolor="bbffbb"
| 115 || August 8 || @ Royals || 6 – 1 || Castillo (9-5) || Suzuki (5-7) || || 14,086 || 59-56
|- align="center" bgcolor="ffbbbb"
| 116 || August 9 || @ Royals || 5 – 3 || Suppan (6-6) || Trachsel (6-11) || Larkin (1) || 14,198 || 59-57
|- align="center" bgcolor="bbffbb"
| 117 || August 10 || @ Royals || 15 – 7 || Carpenter (8-10) || Fussell (4-3) || || 18,188 || 60-57
|- align="center" bgcolor="ffbbbb"
| 118 || August 11 || @ Twins || 9 – 4 || Romero (2-1) || Escobar (7-13) || || 13,360 || 60-58
|- align="center" bgcolor="ffbbbb"
| 119 || August 12 || @ Twins || 6 – 3 || Redman (11-5) || Loaiza (6-9) || Hawkins (8) || 30,161 || 60-59
|- align="center" bgcolor="bbffbb"
| 120 || August 13 || @ Twins || 13 – 3 || Carpenter (9-10) || Radke (8-13) || || 25,656 || 61-59
|- align="center" bgcolor="ffbbbb"
| 121 || August 15 || Angels || 8 – 4 || Wise (1-1) || Wells (17-5) || || 26,706 || 61-60
|- align="center" bgcolor="bbffbb"
| 122 || August 16 || Angels || 8 – 6 || Koch (6-2) || Pote (1-1) || || 32,497 || 62-60
|- align="center" bgcolor="bbffbb"
| 123 || August 18 || Twins || 3 – 2 || Loaiza (7-9) || Kinney (0-1) || Koch (28) || 23,074 || 63-60
|- align="center" bgcolor="ffbbbb"
| 124 || August 19 || Twins || 5 – 1 || Radke (9-13) || Guthrie (1-3) || Guardado (8) || 25,171 || 63-61
|- align="center" bgcolor="bbffbb"
| 125 || August 20 || Twins || 6 – 3 || Wells (18-5) || Carrasco (3-3) || || 32,627 || 64-61
|- align="center" bgcolor="bbffbb"
| 126 || August 22 || Royals || 7 – 5 || Escobar (8-13) || Santiago (6-4) || Koch (29) || 22,551 || 65-61
|- align="center" bgcolor="bbffbb"
| 127 || August 23 || Royals || 9 – 8 || Escobar (9-13) || Larkin (0-2) || Koch (30) || 22,616 || 66-61
|- align="center" bgcolor="ffbbbb"
| 128 || August 25 || @ Rangers || 1 – 0 (11)|| Venafro (2-1) || Koch (6-3) || || 35,365 || 66-62
|- align="center" bgcolor="bbffbb"
| 129 || August 26 || @ Rangers || 9 – 3 || Hamilton (1-0) || Sikorski (1-2) || Borbón (1) || 39,388 || 67-62
|- align="center" bgcolor="bbffbb"
| 130 || August 27 || @ Rangers || 6 – 4 || Trachsel (7-11) || Helling (14-9) || Koch (31) || 21,896 || 68-62
|- align="center" bgcolor="bbffbb"
| 131 || August 28 || @ Angels || 4 – 2 || Loaiza (8-9) || Ortiz (4-5) || Koch (32) || 17,483 || 69-62
|- align="center" bgcolor="ffbbbb"
| 132 || August 29 || @ Angels || 9 – 4 || Holtz (2-3) || Carpenter (9-11) || || 17,773 || 69-63
|- align="center" bgcolor="bbffbb"
| 133 || August 30 || @ Angels || 11 – 2 || Wells (19-5) || Wise (3-2) || || 19,653 || 70-63
|-

|- align="center" bgcolor="bbffbb"
| 134 || September 1 || Athletics || 4 – 3 || Frascatore (2-3) || Jones (3-2) || || 22,187 || 71-63
|- align="center" bgcolor="ffbbbb"
| 135 || September 2 || Athletics || 8 – 0 || Heredia (14-9) || Trachsel (7-12) || Mecir (3) || 26,261 || 71-64
|- align="center" bgcolor="ffbbbb"
| 136 || September 3 || Athletics || 4 – 3 || Hudson (15-6) || Loaiza (8-10) || Mecir (4) || 24,156 || 71-65
|- align="center" bgcolor="ffbbbb"
| 137 || September 4 || Athletics || 10 – 0 || Zito (3-3) || Wells (19-6) || || 21,824 || 71-66
|- align="center" bgcolor="ffbbbb"
| 138 || September 5 || Mariners || 4 – 3 || Rhodes (4-7) || Escobar (9-14) || Sasaki (32) || 21,128 || 71-67
|- align="center" bgcolor="bbffbb"
| 139 || September 6 || Mariners || 7 – 3 || Hamilton (2-0) || Halama (11-8) || || 17,055 || 72-67
|- align="center" bgcolor="ffbbbb"
| 140 || September 7 || Mariners || 8 – 1 || García (6-4) || Trachsel (7-13) || || 17,571 || 72-68
|- align="center" bgcolor="bbffbb"
| 141 || September 8 || Tigers || 3 – 0 || Loaiza (9-10) || Weaver (9-13) || || 19,121 || 73-68
|- align="center" bgcolor="bbffbb"
| 142 || September 9 || Tigers || 6 – 5 || Koch (7-3) || Nitkowski (4-9) || || 23,623 || 74-68
|- align="center" bgcolor="bbffbb"
| 143 || September 10 || Tigers || 6 – 2 || Carpenter (10-11) || Sparks (6-4) || Escobar (1) || 21,666 || 75-68
|- align="center" bgcolor="ffbbbb"
| 144 || September 12 || @ Yankees || 10 – 2 || Neagle (7-4) || Hamilton (2-1) || || 30,370 || 75-69
|- align="center" bgcolor="ffbbbb"
| 145 || September 13 || @ Yankees || 3 – 2 || Clemens (13-6) || Loaiza (9-11) || Rivera (34) || 29,083 || 75-70
|- align="center" bgcolor="bbffbb"
| 146 || September 14 || @ Yankees || 3 – 2 (11)|| Koch (8-3) || Choate (0-1) || Escobar (2) || 35,040 || 76-70
|- align="center" bgcolor="bbffbb"
| 147 || September 15 || @ White Sox || 6 – 5 || Escobar (10-14) || Garland (3-7) || Koch (33) || 23,105 || 77-70
|- align="center" bgcolor="ffbbbb"
| 148 || September 16 || @ White Sox || 6 – 3 || Wunsch (6-3) || Escobar (10-15) || Foulke (31) || 33,204 || 77-71
|- align="center" bgcolor="bbffbb"
| 149 || September 17 || @ White Sox || 14 – 1 || Painter (2-0) || Wells (5-9) || || 26,113 || 78-71
|- align="center" bgcolor="bbffbb"
| 150 || September 19 || Yankees || 16 – 3 || Trachsel (8-13) || Pettitte (18-8) || || 28,908 || 79-71
|- align="center" bgcolor="bbffbb"
| 151 || September 20 || Yankees || 7 – 2 || Loaiza (10-11) || Cone (4-13) || || 28,463 || 80-71
|- align="center" bgcolor="bbffbb"
| 152 || September 21 || Yankees || 3 – 1 || Wells (20-6) || Hernández (12-12) || || 30,074 || 81-71
|- align="center" bgcolor="ffbbbb"
| 153 || September 22 || Devil Rays || 3 – 2 || Lidle (3-6) || Frascatore (2-4) || Hernández (30) || 18,063 || 81-72
|- align="center" bgcolor="bbffbb"
| 154 || September 23 || Devil Rays || 7 – 6 || Koch (9-3) || Enders (0-1) || || 24,473 || 82-72
|- align="center" bgcolor="ffbbbb"
| 155 || September 24 || Devil Rays || 6 – 0 || Harper (1-2) || Trachsel (8-14) || || 28,172 || 82-73
|- align="center" bgcolor="ffbbbb"
| 156 || September 25 || Devil Rays || 5 – 1 || Wilson (1-4) || Loaiza (10-12) || Hernández (31) || 20,715 || 82-74
|- align="center" bgcolor="ffbbbb"
| 157 || September 26 || @ Orioles || 2 – 1 || Mercedes (13-7) || Wells (20-7) || Kohlmeier (13) || 31,614 || 82-75
|- align="center" bgcolor="bbffbb"
| 158 || September 27 || @ Orioles || 4 – 0 || Castillo (10-5) || Ponson (9-13) || || 30,362 || 83-75
|- align="center" bgcolor="ffbbbb"
| 159 || September 28 || @ Orioles || 23 – 1 || Rapp (9-12) || Carpenter (10-12) || || 32,203 || 83-76
|- align="center" bgcolor="ffbbbb"
| 160 || September 29 || @ Indians || 8 – 4 || Speier (5-2) || Trachsel (8-15) || Karsay (20) || 42,768 || 83-77
|- align="center" bgcolor="ffbbbb"
| 161 || September 30 || @ Indians || 6 – 5 || Finley (16-11) || Loaiza (10-13) || Wickman (14) || 42,676 || 83-78
|-

|- align="center" bgcolor="ffbbbb"
| 162 || October 1 || @ Indians || 11 – 4 || Woodard (3-3) || Wells (20-8) || || 42,594 || 83-79
|-

Player stats

Batting

Starters by position
Note: Pos = Position; G = Games played; AB = At bats; R = Runs; H = Hits; HR = Home runs; RBI = Runs batted in; Avg. = Batting average; TB = Total bases

Other batters
Note: G = Games played; AB = At bats; R = Runs;  H = Hits; HR = Home runs; RBI = Runs batted in; Avg. = Batting average; TB = Total bases

Pitching

Starting pitchers
Note: G = Games pitched; IP = Innings pitched; W = Wins; L = Losses; ERA = Earned run average; SO = Strikeouts

Other pitchers
Note: G = Games pitched; IP = Innings pitched; W = Wins; L = Losses; ERA = Earned run average; SO = Strikeouts

Relief pitchers
Note: G = Games pitched; W = Wins; L = Losses; SV = Saves; ERA = Earned run average; SO = Strikeouts

Award winners
 Carlos Delgado, Hank Aaron Award
 Carlos Delgado, Silver Slugger Award
 Carlos Delgado, The Sporting News Player of the Year Award

All-Star Game
David Wells, P, starter
Carlos Delgado, 1B, reserve
Tony Batista, 3B, reserve

Farm system

References

External links
2000 Toronto Blue Jays at Baseball Reference
2000 Toronto Blue Jays at Baseball Almanac

Toronto Blue Jays seasons
Toronto Blue Jays season
2000 in Canadian sports
2000 in Toronto